"Loyalty" is a song by American rapper Birdman. The song features Young Money/Cash Money artists Lil Wayne and Tyga. It is about loyalty and not forgetting where one has come from.

Directed by David Rousseau.

Music video 
The official music video for "Loyalty" was released to MTV on June 16, 2010. The video was shot before Lil Wayne went to jail on a gun charge. The video was shot in front of a green screen and includes cameos from Drake, Mack Maine, Lil Chuckee, and Short Dawg all wearing diapers. The video features backdrops of Tyga's hometown Compton, Birdman's and Lil Wayne's hometown of New Orleans and their adopted town Miami.

Remix 
A remix was released by Birdman featuring Cash Money artists Tyga, Brisco, Mack Maine, Bow Wow, Lil Twist, and Cory Gunz.

Track listing 
 iTunes single digital download
 "Loyalty" (featuring Lil Wayne & Tyga) - 3:57

iTunes Loyalty EP digital download
 "Loyalty" (Birdman featuring Lil Wayne & Tyga) - 3:57
 "Pop That" (Lil Wayne featuring Birdman) - 3:16
 "Loyalty" (Music Video)

Charts

References 

2010 singles
Birdman (rapper) songs
Lil Wayne songs
Tyga songs
Cash Money Records singles
Songs written by Lil Wayne
Song recordings produced by Kane Beatz
2010 songs
Songs written by Kane Beatz
Songs written by Tyga
Songs written by Birdman (rapper)